Gymnothorax melatremus, the blackspot moray, dirty yellow moray or dwarf moray, is a moray eel from the Indo-Pacific. It occasionally makes its way into the aquarium trade. It grows to 26 cm in length.

References

 

melatremus
Fish of Hawaii
Fish described in 1953